The Kelowna Community Theatre is an 853-seat Theatre in Kelowna, British Columbia, Canada. It is the home of the Kelowna Community Concert Society it is also the home of the Okanagan Symphony Orchestra and has been since it opened.

External links
Kelowna Community Theatre

Theatres in British Columbia
Music venues in British Columbia
Buildings and structures in Kelowna
Culture of Kelowna